Anthony Wilfred James Whitford  (born June 11, 1941) is a retired Canadian politician, who served as the commissioner of the Northwest Territories from 2005 to 2010.

Whitford was born in 1941 and raised in the Northwest Territories, in the small town of Fort Smith, at the time the capital of the NWT.

As a young man, he worked for Northern Transportation Company (NTCL) on the boats sailing the Mackenzie River and for Northern Canada Power Commission (NCPC) in Fort Smith and Taltson River. Whitford and family moved to Calgary in 1973 where he attended the University of Calgary. He moved to Yellowknife in 1977 and began a career with the Territorial and Federal governments.

Whitford entered the political arena in 1988 and retired in 2010 after 22 years of civil service. In June 2010, Whitford was appointed as an Honorary Naval Captain of the Royal Canadian Navy.

Political career
Whitford was first elected to the Northwest Territories Legislative Assembly in 1988 to replace Ted Richard who had been appointed to the Supreme Court of the Northwest Territories. In the 1991 election he was elected to the 12th NWT Assembly representing Yellowknife South.

While not elected in the 1995 election, he was elected, with over 80% of the vote, to the Kam Lake electoral district in the 1999 election sitting in the 24th NWT Assembly. On January 19, 2000 he was appointed Speaker of the Legislative Assembly of the Northwest Territories, replacing Samuel Gargan, a position he was to hold until December 11, 2003.

In October 2004 he became Deputy Commissioner of the Northwest Territories and was appointed Commissioner of the Northwest Territories on April 29, 2005.

Whitford completed his term as Commissioner in April 2010 and now serves as an Honorary Naval Captain of the Canadian Navy. He maintains a busy schedule with frequent travel to the communities of the Northwest Territories as well as tending to obligations in southern Canada and overseas. Whitford was made a member of the Order of the Northwest Territories in 2016.

Personal life

Whitford married Mary Elaine Whitford (née Sweet) on November 9, 1966. The couple had three children, sons Warren (born June 19, 1968), Blair (born March 6, 1970), and Ian (born March 12, 1971). Elaine died of breast cancer on February 23, 2003. He attended the University of Calgary and earned a Bachelor of Social Work in 1977.

Whitford lives in Yellowknife and can often be found at the local Tim Hortons enjoying a coffee and discussing politics with the locals. His hobbies include wood working from which he crafts  bird houses.

References

External links
Biography, ainc-inac.gc.ca; accessed June 14, 2017.

Members of the Legislative Assembly of the Northwest Territories
1941 births
Living people
Métis politicians
Northwest Territories Deputy Commissioners
Commissioners of the Northwest Territories
Speakers of the Legislative Assembly of the Northwest Territories
People from Fort Smith, Northwest Territories
Members of the Order of the Northwest Territories
Canadian Métis people